Sven Ohlsson (25 February 1886 – 27 April 1961) was a Swedish wrestler. He competed at the 1912 Summer Olympics and the 1920 Summer Olympics.

References

External links
 

1886 births
1961 deaths
Olympic wrestlers of Sweden
Wrestlers at the 1912 Summer Olympics
Wrestlers at the 1920 Summer Olympics
Swedish male sport wrestlers
People from Värnamo Municipality
Sportspeople from Jönköping County
20th-century Swedish people